Cairney railway station served the village of Millerhill, Midlothian, Scotland from 1844 to 1849 on the Edinburgh and Dalkeith Railway.

History 
The station opened in March 1844 by the Edinburgh and Dalkeith Railway. The station was in the middle of Millerhill Marshalling Yard. Information on this intermediate station, like the rest on the line, is vague. It is unlikely that the station had any facilities or platforms. The station closed when the North British Railway took over for re-gauging; it never reopened.

References

External links 

Disused railway stations in Midlothian
Former North British Railway stations
Railway stations in Great Britain opened in 1844
Railway stations in Great Britain closed in 1849
1844 establishments in Scotland
1849 disestablishments in Scotland